Portland is an unincorporated community in eastern Lebanon Township, Meigs County, Ohio, United States.  It has a post office with the ZIP code 45770.

It lies on the Ohio River, located below Long Bottom and above Racine.

Education
Public education in the community of Portland is provided by the Southern Local School District. Campuses serving the community include Southern Elementary School (Grades K-8) and Southern High School (Grades 9-12).

Climate
The climate in this area is characterized by relatively high temperatures and evenly distributed precipitation throughout the year.  According to the Köppen Climate Classification system, Portland has a Humid subtropical climate, abbreviated "Cfa" on climate maps.

References

Unincorporated communities in Ohio
Unincorporated communities in Meigs County, Ohio
Ohio populated places on the Ohio River